Georgy Eduardovich Bergmann was a Russian General of the Infantry who was known for organizing the Bergmann Offensive against the Ottoman Empire during the First World War. He was also a commander of the White Army during the Russian Civil War.

Early Years
From a noble Baltic-German family in the Governorate of Livonia, Bergmann was born in the village of Kurakh, Dagestan Oblast. He received his general education at the 2nd Moscow Military Gymnasium.

He entered the service as a cadet at the Pavel Military School on August 9, 1873. 
After graduating from college in 1876, with the rank of ensign, he was sent to the Caucasus in the 21st artillery brigade. He then participated in the Russo-Turkish War of 1877-1878. In 1881 he graduated from the General Staff Academy.

Service of the Caucasus
From 1881 to 1887, Bergmann was senior adjutant of the headquarters of the 21st Infantry Division. On March 19, 1888, he was appointed senior adjutant of the mobilization department of the headquarters of the Caucasian Military District. In 1892 he was promoted to colonel "for distinction in service".

From June 7, 1893, to April 7, 1898 - the commander of the Lori reserve regiment. 
From April 7, 1898, to November 28, 1899 - the commander of the 257th infantry reserve Poti regiment. 
From November 28, 1899, to November 27, - 1902 the commander of the 81st infantry regiment of Absheron. 
On November 27, 1902 "for distinction in service" he was promoted to major general and appointed chief of staff of the 2nd Caucasian Army Corps.

The main service took place at the General Staff in the Caucasus Military District, and from January 31, 1907, to January 29, 1913, he was the chief of staff of the district.

Service in the Kazan military district
On January 29, 1913, he was transferred to the Kazan Military District and appointed commander of the 24th Army Corps. On April 14, 1913 "for distinction in service" he was promoted to general from infantry.

World War I
On January 2, 1914, he was appointed commander of the 2nd Caucasian Army Corps, with which he entered the war.

From December 11, 1914, to February 4, 1915, Bergmann was commander of the 1st Caucasus Army Corps. On February 4, 1915, he was appointed at the disposal of the Commander-in-Chief of the Caucasian Army. As the head of the Sarykamysh group of forces, he won a brilliant victory over the Turkish army in the Battle of Sarikamish, for which on July 26, 1916, he was awarded the Order of St. George, 4th degree. It is worth noting that he received the order some time later, since initially the victory was attributed to Lieutenant General Nikolai Yudenich, chief of the field headquarters of the Caucasian army. From November 13, 1916, to April 5, 1917, Bergmann was commander of the 40th Army Corps on the Southwestern and Romanian Fronts.

He was a member of the Volunteer Army, with which he went to Constantinople, then to Bulgaria, then moved to Marseille, where he headed a branch of the Russian All-Military Union.

He died on February 2, 1929. His ashes were transferred to the Russian Orthodox Cemetery, Nice on March 9, 1930.

Family
Wife - Elena Vasilievna (1864-1963), daughter of General Vasily Potto.
Children: Elena, George, Maria, Veronica (married Dolittle), Irina.

Awards
Order of St. Anna, 4th degree (1878)
Order of St. Stanislaus, 3rd class with swords and bow (1878)
Order of St. Anna, 3rd class with swords and bow (1878)
Order of St. Stanislaus, 2nd degree (1884)
Order of St. Anna 2nd degree (1888)
Order of St. Vladimir, 4th degree (1895)
Order of St. Vladimir 3rd degree (1900)
Order of St. Stanislaus 1st degree (1904)
Order of St. Anna, 1st degree (1906)
Order of St. Vladimir, 2nd degree (September 5, 1909)
Order of the White Eagle, (December 6, 1912)
Order of St. Alexander Nevsky with Swords (July 7, 1915)
Order of Saint George 4th degree (July 26, 1916)

Foreign Awards
: Order of the Lion and the Sun, 1st Degree
: Persian Order of the Lion and the Sun, 2nd degree
: Order of the Star of Romania with swords (1917)

References

Bibliography
Rutych NN Biographical reference book of the highest ranks of the Volunteer Army and the Armed Forces of the South of Russia: Materials for the history of the White movement. - M., 2002
Zalessky K.A. Who was who in the First World War. - M., 2003
 
 Berkhman's biography
 
 Berkhman Georgy Eduardovich
 Korsun N.G.Sarykamysh operation - M .: Military Publishing House of the NKO of the USSR, 1937 .-- 164 p.
 Sarykamysh operation, 12-24 December 1914: some documents

1854 births
1929 deaths
Imperial Russian Army generals
Recipients of the Order of the White Eagle (Russia)
Recipients of the Order of St. Anna, 1st class
Recipients of the Order of Saint Stanislaus (Russian), 1st class
White Russian emigrants to France
Russian military personnel of the Russo-Turkish War (1877–1878)
Russian military personnel of World War I
Russian nobility